The 2009–10 Liga Nacional de Fútbol de Honduras season is the 45th season of top-flight professional football in Honduras and the nineteenth season in which the Apertura and Clausura system is used.

Marathón and Olimpia claimed the Apertura and Clausura championships, respectively.

Club information
Ten teams will participate in the 2009–10 season. Nine teams from last season remain for this season. Real Juventud were relegated at the end of the 2008–09 season. They would have been replaced by Liga Nacional de Ascenso de Honduras promotion play-off winners Atlético Gualala. However, both teams decided to merge under the name of Real Juventud prior to the season.

Torneo Apertura
The Torneo Apertura began on July 18, 2009, and ended on November 25, 2009. Marathón, Motagua, Olimpia and Real España qualified for the Apertura final round after ending the tournament in the top four places.

Classification stage

Standings

Results

Final stage
The Final Stage ran from November 7, 2009, to November 25, 2009. Two-legged ties in this stage were settled by points: three for a win, one for a draw, and zero for a loss. Ties in points in the semifinals were settled first by goal difference, followed by the Classification Stage standings. A tie in points in the Finals would be settled by goal difference first, followed by two 15-minute extra-time periods, then a penalty shootout if necessary.

Semifinals

Finals

Top goalscorers

Torneo Clausura
The Torneo Clausura will begin in January 2010 and end in May 2010. The best four clubs will qualify for the Clausura final round.

Classification stage

Standings

Results

Final stage

Semifinals

Final

 Olimpia won 3–2 on aggregate.

Top goalscorers

Relegation
Relegation to the 2010–11 Liga Nacional de Ascenso de Honduras is determined from an aggregate table of the Apertura and Clausura tournaments. The team with the worst overall record will be relegated.

References

Liga Nacional de Fútbol Profesional de Honduras seasons
1
Honduras